Poşta Veche may refer to:

a village in Stângăceaua Commune, Mehedinţi County, Romania
a district of Chisinau, Moldova.

See also 
 Poșta (disambiguation)